Michael D. Ramsey (born 22 July 1964) is an American legal scholar.

Ramsey studied history and economics at Dartmouth College, graduating in 1986 with a bachelor of arts degree. He then attended Stanford Law School. After completing his legal studies in 1989, Ramsey served as a law clerk for J. Clifford Wallace and Antonin Scalia. Ramsey is the Hugh and Hazel Darling Foundation Professor of Law at the University of San Diego School of Law. In 2021, he was appointed to the Presidential Commission on the Supreme Court of the United States.

References

American legal scholars
Living people
1964 births
University of San Diego faculty
Dartmouth College alumni
Stanford Law School alumni